The Amtrak Cascades is a passenger train corridor in the Pacific Northwest, operated by Amtrak in partnership with the U.S. states of Washington and Oregon. It is named after the Cascade mountain range that the route parallels. The  corridor runs from Vancouver, British Columbia, through Seattle, Washington and Portland, Oregon to Eugene, Oregon.

In the fiscal year 2017, Cascades was Amtrak's eighth-busiest route with a total annual ridership of over 810,000. In fiscal year 2018, farebox recovery ratio for the train was 63%. On-time performance in FY2021 was 58.7%.

, eight trains operate along the corridor each day – one round trip between Vancouver, BC and Seattle, one round trip between Seattle and Portland, and two round trips between Seattle and Eugene. , no train travels the entire length of the corridor. For trains that do not travel directly to Vancouver or Eugene, connections are available on Amtrak Thruway bus services. Additionally, Amtrak Thruway services offer connections to other destinations in British Columbia, Idaho, Oregon, and Washington not on the rail corridor.

History

Prior service
Passenger train service between Seattle and Portland—the core of what became the Cascades corridor—was operated as a joint partnership by the Northern Pacific, Great Northern, and Union Pacific from 1925 to 1970, with the three railroads cross-honoring tickets on their Seattle-Portland routes. When Great Northern and Northern Pacific were folded into the Burlington Northern in 1970, the reconfigured partnership continued to operate the Seattle-Portland service until the creation of Amtrak in 1971.  Service between Vancouver, BC and Seattle was provided via the Great Northern/Burlington Northern International, and between Portland and Eugene by Southern Pacific.

Amtrak era

Amtrak took over intercity passenger rail operations from the private railroads on May 1, 1971. Initial service on the Seattle–Portland portion of the corridor consisted of three daily round trips–one long-distance train running all the way to San Diego, along with two corridor trains inherited from Burlington Northern. There was no corridor service south to Eugene, and no service to the Canadian border at all. The trains were unnamed until November 1971, when the two corridor trains were named the Mount Rainier and Puget Sound and the long-distance train became the Coast Starlight.

Passenger rail service to Vancouver, BC was restarted on July 17, 1972, with the inauguration of the Seattle–Vancouver Pacific International, which operated with a dome car (unusual for short runs). The train was Amtrak's first international service.

The next major change to service in the corridor came on June 7, 1977, when Amtrak introduced the long-distance Pioneer between Seattle, Portland and Salt Lake City, Utah. To maintain the same level of service between Seattle and Portland, the Puget Sound was eliminated, and the schedule of the Mount Rainier was shifted.

The corridor expanded south of Portland to Eugene on August 3, 1980, with the addition of the Willamette Valley, which operated with two daily round trips, financially subsidized by the State of Oregon.

The Pacific International and Willamette Valley struggled to attract riders and were discontinued in September 1981 and December 1981, respectively.

This left three trains on the Seattle–Portland corridor: the regional Mount Rainier and the long-distance Pioneer and Coast Starlight. This level of service would remain unchanged for 13 years.

Expansion in the 1990s 

 
In 1994, Amtrak began a six-month trial run of modern Talgo equipment over the Seattle–Portland corridor. Amtrak named this service Northwest Talgo, and announced that it would institute a second, conventional train on the corridor (supplementing the Mount Rainier) once the trial concluded. Regular service began on April 1, 1994.

Looking toward the future, Amtrak did an exhibition trip from Vancouver through to Eugene. Amtrak replaced the Northwest Talgo with the Mount Adams on October 30. At the same time, the state of Oregon and Amtrak agreed to extend the Mount Rainier to Eugene through June 1995, with Oregon paying two-thirds of the $1.5 million subsidy.

Service to Vancouver, BC returned on May 26, 1995, when the Mount Baker International began running between Vancouver and Seattle. The state of Washington leased Talgo equipment similar to the demonstrator from 1994. The Mount Rainier was renamed the Cascadia in October 1995; the new name reflected the joint Oregon–Washington operations of the train.

A third Seattle–Portland corridor train began in the spring of 1998 with leased Talgo equipment, replacing the discontinued long-distance Pioneer. The other Seattle–Portland/Eugene trains began using Talgo trainsets as well, while the Seattle-Vancouver train used conventional equipment. In preparation for the Vancouver route receiving Talgo equipment as well, Amtrak introduced the temporary Pacific Northwest brand for all four trains, dropping individual names, effective with the spring 1998 timetable.

Amtrak Cascades

Amtrak announced the new Amtrak Cascades brand in the fall 1998 timetable; the new equipment began operation in December. The full Cascades brand was rolled out on January 12, 1999, following a six-week delay due to an issue with the seat designs on the Talgo trainsets. Amtrak extended a second train to Eugene in late 2000.

From the mid-1990s to the May 12, 2008, Amtrak system timetable, full service dining was available on trains going north out of Seattle's King Street Station to Vancouver. The southern trains to Portland briefly had full dining services until the May 16, 1999, system timetable.

In 2004, the Rail Plus program began, allowing cross-ticketing between Sound Transit's Sounder commuter rail and Amtrak between Seattle and Everett on some Cascades trains.

The corridor continued to grow, with another Portland–Seattle train arriving in 2006, and the long-awaited through service between Vancouver, BC and Portland, eliminating the need to transfer in Seattle, beginning on August 19, 2009 as a pilot project to determine whether a train permanently operating on the route would be feasible. 
With the Canadian federal government requesting Amtrak to pay for border control costs for the second daily train, the train was scheduled to be discontinued on October 31, 2010. However, Washington State and Canadian officials held discussions in an attempt to continue the service, which resulted in the Canadian government permanently waiving the fee.

Two additional round trips between Seattle and Portland were added on December 18, 2017; an early morning departure from each city and a late evening return, enabling same-day business travel between the two cities. On the first day of service, a train derailed outside of DuPont, Washington, south of Tacoma.

COVID-19 pandemic

In March 2020, Amtrak Cascades service north of Seattle was suspended indefinitely after all non-essential travel across the Canada–United States border was restricted in response to the COVID-19 pandemic. Amtrak crews ran practice trips between Seattle and Vancouver, BC, in February 2022, and service between those two cities resumed on September 26, 2022. The round trip between Portland and Vancouver resumed on March 7, 2023, restoring the second Seattle–Vancouver trip that existed prior to the COVID-19 pandemic. Seattle–Portland service is planned to increase later in 2023.

Route

Stations

Ridership
Total ridership for 2008 was 774,421, the highest annual ridership since inception of the service in 1993.  Ridership declined in 2009 to 740,154 but rose 13% in fiscal year 2010 to 836,499 riders, and to 847,709 riders in 2011.

Ridership declined steadily between 2011 and 2015, attributed in part to competition from low-cost bus carrier BoltBus, which opened a non-stop Seattle–Portland route in May 2012. Low gasoline prices and schedule changes due to track construction also contributed to the decline. Ridership rose again in 2016, and was expected to continue rising in 2017 and beyond, after the completion of the Point Defiance Bypass construction project. The COVID-19 pandemic drastically reduced ridership numbers throughout the entire Amtrak network.

Rolling stock 

Service on the Cascades route is currently provided using two articulated trainsets manufactured by Talgo, along with equipment from Amtrak's national fleet. These cars are designed to passively tilt into curves, allowing the train to pass through them at higher speeds than a conventional train. The tilting technology reduces travel time between Seattle and Portland by 25 minutes.

A typical trainset consists of 13 cars:
one baggage car;
two "business class" coaches;
one lounge car (also known as the Diner car);
one cafe car (also known as the Bistro car);
seven "coach class" coaches; and
one combination cab/power car (which houses a driver's cab, a head-end power generator and other equipment).
 Trainsets are typically paired with a Siemens Charger locomotive painted in a matching paint scheme. Additionally, trainsets without a cab car are paired with a Non-Powered Control Unit (NPCU), an older locomotive with no engine, that is also painted in a matching paint scheme and is used as a cab car.

The fleet consists of two Talgo Series 8 trainsets built in 2013. These trainsets operated alongside five older Talgo Series VI trainsets until their retirement in 2020. The service offered by the different trainset types is similar, but there are some minor differences between the two models. The most notable difference is the older Series VI trainsets have  tail fins at both ends of the train that serve as an aesthetic transition from the low-profile trainsets and the larger locomotives. The Series 8 trainsets do not have the tail fins, but instead have a cab built into the power car allowing push-pull operation without a separate control unit. There are also minor differences in the interior appointments.

The Cascades service started in Fall 1998 with four Series VI trainsets, two were owned by the Washington State Department of Transportation (WSDOT) and two were owned by Amtrak. Each trainset was built with 12 cars and a six-car spare set, including a baggage car, service car, lounge car, café car and two "coach class" coaches, was also built. The trainsets can hold 304 passengers in 12 cars.

In 1998, Amtrak also purchased an additional Series VI trainset as a demonstrator for potential service between Los Angeles and Las Vegas. This trainset was built with two additional "coach class" coaches, for a total of 14 cars. The demonstration route was not funded and WSDOT purchased the trainset in 2004 to expand service. The purchase also allowed Amtrak and WSDOT to redistribute the "coach class" coaches. By using the two additional coaches from this new trainset and placing the two coaches from the spare set into regular service, the agencies were able to create four 13-car trains and one 12-car train.

In 2013, the Oregon Department of Transportation (ODOT) purchased the two Series 8 trainsets to enable further expansion of services. Each trainset was equipped with 13 cars.

The Cascades equipment is painted in a special paint scheme consisting of colors the agency calls evergreen (dark green), cappuccino (brown), and cream. The trainsets are named after mountain peaks in the Pacific Northwest (many in the Cascade Range). The four original Series VI trainsets were named after Mount Baker, Mount Hood, Mount Olympus, and Mount Rainier. The Series VI trainset built to operate between Las Vegas and Los Angeles (painted in Surfliner colors) was renamed the Mount Adams when it was purchased by the state of Washington. This trainset was subsequently destroyed in the December 18, 2017, derailment on the Point Defiance Cutoff.  The two Series 8 trainsets are named Mount Bachelor and Mount Jefferson.

In early 2014, the Washington State Department of Transportation (WSDOT), awarded a contract to Siemens USA to manufacture 8 new Siemens Charger locomotives for the Cascades. The order was part of a larger joint purchase between Illinois, California, Michigan, and Missouri. These locomotives were delivered to WSDOT in Summer 2017 and went into service in late 2017. The additional locomotives were to have enabled two additional runs to be added as part of the Point Defiance Bypass project (the additional service was suspended and its recommencement has not been announced) and will replace the six EMD F59PHI locomotives leased from Amtrak; these were sold to Metra in early 2018. One SC-44 locomotive was destroyed in the December 18, 2017, derailment on the Point Defiance Cutoff, but was soon replaced by a newly built Charger by Siemens (1408) in August 2020. In the wake of the accident, Amtrak proposed to lease or buy two Talgo trainsets which were originally bought for use in Wisconsin but never operated.

In August 2019, the Federal Railroad Administration awarded WSDOT up to $37.5 million to purchase three new trainsets for the route, allowing the replacement of the older Talgo VI trainsets. The Talgo VI trainsets were withdrawn in June 2020. As a temporary replacement, Horizon cars are being used alongside the existing Talgo Series 8 sets, until new cars are introduced. The last two remaining Talgo VI trainsets were hauled to a scrapper on February 28, 2021. One Series VI Bistro car was later acquired by Northwest Railway Museum in 2023.

Amtrak and Siemens Mobility announced a $7.3 billion national railcar order in July 2021, which includes funding for 48 new Siemens Venture coaches and 2 additional Charger locomotives for Cascades service. Deliveries are expected to begin in 2024, with service expected to begin in 2026 after funding is approved by Congress. These trainsets will be used to replace the Talgo VI trainsets retired in 2020, as well as to expand service. The new coaches will be used in six-coach trainsets with a capacity of 300 passengers, far more than the capacity of the Talgo trainsets, and will be able to modify trainset lengths based on expected passenger demand. The new coaches are expected to cost WSDOT $150 million, of which $75 million has been secured as of July 2021. Additional funding is expected from the federal government, as well as potentially the governments of Oregon and British Columbia.

Funding 
Funding for the route is provided separately by the states of Oregon and Washington, with Union Station in Portland serving as the dividing point between the two. As of July 1, 2006, Washington state has funded four daily round trips between Seattle and Portland. Washington also funds two daily round trips between Seattle and Vancouver, BC. Oregon funds two daily round trips between Eugene and Portland. The seven trainsets are organized into semi-regular operating cycles, but no particular train always has one route.

Local partnerships 
As a result of Cascades service being jointly funded by the Washington and Oregon departments of transportation, public transit agencies and local municipalities can offer a variety of discounts, including companion ticket coupons.
 FlexPass and University of Washington UPass holders receive a 15% discount (discount code varies) on all regular Cascades travel. Employers participating in these programs may also receive a limited number of free companion ticket coupons for distribution to employees.
 The Sound Transit RailPlus program allows riders to use weekday Cascades trains between Everett and Seattle with the Sounder commuter rail fare structure.

The Cascades service also benefits from Sound Transit's track upgrades for Sounder service, notably the Point Defiance Bypass project.

Proposed changes 

According to its long-range plan, the WSDOT Rail Office plans eventual service of 13 daily round trips between Seattle and Portland and 4–6 round trips between Seattle and Bellingham, with four of those extending to Vancouver, BC.  Amtrak Cascades travels along the entirety of the proposed Pacific Northwest High Speed Rail Corridor; the incremental improvements are designed to result in eventual higher-speed service.  According to WSDOT, the "hundreds of curves" in the current route and "the cost of acquiring land and constructing a brand new route" make upgrades so cost-prohibitive that, at most, speeds of 110 mph (177 km/h) can be achieved.

The eventual high-speed rail service according to the long-range plan should result in the following travel times:
 Seattle to Portland – 3:30 (2006); 3:20 (after completion of Point Defiance Bypass); 2:30 (planned)
 Seattle to Vancouver BC – 3:55 (2006); 2:45 (planned)
 Vancouver BC to Portland – 7:55 (2009); 5:25 (planned)

In order to increase train speeds and frequency to meet these goals, a number of incremental track improvement projects must be completed. Gates and signals must be improved, some grade crossings must be separated, track must be replaced or upgraded and station capacities must be increased.

In order to extend the second daily Seattle to Bellingham round trip to Vancouver, BNSF was required to make track improvements in Canada, to which the government of British Columbia was asked to contribute financially. On March 1, 2007, an agreement between the province, Amtrak, and BNSF was reached, allowing a second daily train to and from Vancouver. The project involved building an  siding in Delta, BC at a cost of US$7 million; construction started in 2007 and has been completed.

In December 2008, WSDOT published a mid-range plan detailing projects needed to achieve the midpoint level of service proposed in the long-range plan.

In 2009, Oregon applied for a $2.1 billion Federal grant to redevelop the unused Oregon Electric Railway tracks, parallel to the Cascades' route between Eugene and Portland. But it did not receive the grant. Instead, analysis of alternative routes to enable more passenger trains and higher speeds proceeded. In 2015, the current route, with numerous upgrades, was chosen by the Project Team as the Recommended Preferred Alternative. The Preferred Alternative, if built, would decrease the trip time by 15 minutes from 2 hours and 35 minutes to 2 hours and 20 minutes and increase the number of daily trains from 2 to 6 from Eugene to Portland.

In 2013, travel times between Seattle and Portland remained the same as they had been in 1966, with the fastest trains making the journey in 3 hours 30 minutes. WSDOT received more than $800 million in high-speed rail stimulus funds for projects discussed in the mid-range plan, since the corridor is one of the approved high-speed corridors eligible for money from ARRA. The deadline for spending the stimulus funds is September 2017. The schedule was for the Leadership Council to vote on this in December 2015, then a Draft Tier 1 Environmental Impact Statement was to be released in 2016 and hearings held on it, for the Leadership Council to finalize the Recommended Selected Alternative in 2017, then publish the Final Tier 1 EIS and receive the Record of Decision in 2018. Then if funds can be found, design and engineering must be done before any construction can begin.

Accidents and incidents

July 2017 derailment
On July 2, 2017, northbound train 506 derailed while approaching the Chambers Bay drawbridge southwest of Tacoma, Washington. The train was traveling above the speed limit of  after passing an "Approach" signal (indicating that it be prepared to stop short of the next signal) at the bridge. As the bridge was raised and open, a device known as a "de-rail" was engaged, used to prevent a train from proceeding and falling in to the water by derailing it beforehand. The incident root cause was human error due to the engineer losing situational awareness. Only minor injuries were sustained due to the low speed at time of event as the engineer did attempt to stop on seeing the bridge up. The train's consist, an Oregon DOT-owned Talgo VIII set, was returned to the Talgo plant in Milwaukee, Wis. for repairs and returned to service in April 2018.

December 2017 derailment

On December 18, 2017, while making the inaugural run on the Point Defiance Bypass, Amtrak Cascades passenger train 501 derailed near Dupont, Washington, killing three passengers. Positive train control (PTC), a technology meant to help regulate train speed and prevent operator error, was reported to have been installed on the line, but preliminary reports state it was not active. WSDOT announced that it would not resume service until the full implementation of PTC. (Sounder service to Lakewood continued to operate.) Service was then scheduled to restart in early 2019. PTC was activated on the Bypass in March 2019 and the NTSB report was released in May that year; Cascades service resumed on the bypass on November 18, 2021, almost four years after the derailment.

See also 
 United States border preclearance
 Rail transportation in the United States
 Rail transport in Canada

References

Notes

External links 

Amtrak Cascades Train Equipment (Washington State Department of Transportation)
1972 first draft of "Cascades" concept (Oregon Department of Transportation)

Amtrak routes
Named passenger trains of Canada
International named passenger trains
Passenger rail transport in British Columbia
Passenger rail transportation in Oregon
Passenger rail transportation in Washington (state)
Tilting trains
Railway services introduced in 1971
Talgo